Erik Jensen may refer to:

 Erik Jensen (actor), American film, television and theater actor, playwright
 Erik Jensen (American football) (born 1980), former American football player
 Erik Jensen (boxer) (1921-1987), Danish Olympic boxer
 Erik Jensen (footballer), Danish footballer
 Erik Jensen (hurdler) (born 1962), Danish Olympic hurdler
 Erik Jensen (politician), see United Nations Mission for the Referendum in Western Sahara
 Erik Jensen (Greenlandic politician)
 Erik Jensen (writer), author and journalist, co-writer of 2019 film Acute Misfortune
 Erik Aalbæk Jensen (1923–1997), Danish writer
 Erik Kuld Jensen (1925–2004), Danish football player
 Erik Pondal Jensen, Danish footballer

See also
 Eirik Jensen, Norwegian former policeman turned criminal
 Eric Jensen (disambiguation)
 Erik Flensted-Jensen (1908–1993), founder and leader of the Danish Gym Team
 Knut Erik Jensen (born 1940), Norwegian film director